The seventh season of Blue Bloods, a police procedural drama series created by Robin Green and Mitchell Burgess, premiered on CBS September 23, 2016. The season concluded on May 5, 2017.

Cast

Main cast 
Tom Selleck as NYPD Police Commissioner Francis "Frank" Reagan 
Donnie Wahlberg as Detective 1st Grade Daniel "Danny" Reagan
Bridget Moynahan as ADA Erin Reagan
Will Estes as Officer Jamison "Jamie" Reagan
Len Cariou as Henry Reagan
Amy Carlson as Linda Reagan
Sami Gayle as Nicole "Nicky" Reagan-Boyle
Marisa Ramirez as Detective 1st Grade Maria Baez  
Vanessa Ray as Officer Edit "Eddie" Janko

Recurring cast 
Abigail Hawk as Detective 1st Grade Abigail Baker
Gregory Jbara as Deputy Commissioner of Public Information Garrett Moore
Robert Clohessy as Lieutenant Sidney "Sid" Gormley
Steve Schirripa as DA Investigator Anthony Abetemarco
Peter Hermann as Jack Boyle 
Ato Essandoh as Reverend Darnell Potter 
Tony Terraciano as Jack Reagan  
Andrew Terraciano as Sean Regan 
Treat Williams as Lenny Ross

Episodes

Ratings

References

External links

2016 American television seasons
2017 American television seasons
Blue Bloods (TV series)